Hyphomicrobium nitrativorans is a bacterium from the genus of Hyphomicrobium which was isolated from biofilm at the Montreal Biodome in Canada.

References

External links
Type strain of Hyphomicrobium nitrativorans at BacDive -  the Bacterial Diversity Metadatabase

Hyphomicrobiales
Bacteria described in 2013